Graham Burns (born 22 August 1966) is a British sprint and marathon canoeist who competed in the early 1990s. At the 1992 Summer Olympics in Barcelona, he was eliminated in the repechages of the K-1 1000 m event.

References
 

1966 births
Living people
British male canoeists
Olympic canoeists of Great Britain
Canoeists at the 1992 Summer Olympics
Medalists at the ICF Canoe Marathon World Championships